George Alfred Palmer  (born 20 June 1947) is an Australian classical music composer and a former Justice of the Supreme Court of New South Wales.

Early life
Palmer was born in a British military hospital in Egypt in 1947 while his parents, recently demobilised from the British Army, were awaiting a ship to take them to a new life in Australia. Palmer's family arrived in Sydney when he was 3 months old and he has lived there ever since.

He received a Jesuit education at Saint Ignatius' College, Riverview, with particular emphasis on the Classics, languages and history. He graduated in Arts and Law from University of Sydney in 1970.

Musical education
Palmer studied piano from the age of 10. His most influential teachers were Frank Warbrick and Neta Maughan. Warbrick was a noted Australian concert pianist and a champion of new Australian music from the 1940s onwards. He later taught at the Sydney Conservatorium of Music. Maughan has been one of the most important piano teachers in Australia in the last 30 years. Many of her pupils, including Simon Tedeschi, Tamara Anna Cislowska and Aaron McMillan, went on to concert careers.

Palmer's interests always lay in composition rather than performance and he began writing music at an early age. After leaving school, the necessity of earning a livelihood deterred him from pursuing composition as a career but he continued his own intensive study of composition, constantly writing music for his own satisfaction.

Career in law
After graduating, Palmer joined a city law firm where he specialised in commercial law. He developed expertise in oil and mineral exploration law at a time when the resources boom was just beginning in Australia. Within two years of graduation, he became a partner of his law firm.

He became a barrister in 1974, again specialising in commercial law, and built up a successful practice. He was appointed a Queen's Counsel in 1986 and appeared throughout Australia as leading counsel in many of the large commercial cases in the 1990s. In 2001, he was appointed a judge of the Supreme Court of New South Wales. In June 2011, Palmer retired from the court to devote himself full-time to composition.

Emergence as a composer
In 2002, when it became clear that his father did not have long to live, Palmer recorded privately some of his works so that his father could hear his music. By coincidence the recordings came to the attention of the Australian Broadcasting Corporation (ABC).

In 2004, ABC Classic FM broadcast live a concert of his music at the Eugene Goossens Hall in Sydney and ABC TV later that year featured him in Australian Story.

Since then, ABC Classics has released two CDs of his music. Attraction of Opposites (2005) features music for strings. Exaltate Dominum (2007), with Cantillation and Sinfonia Australis, conducted by Paul Stanhope, includes his Christmas Mass A Child Is Born, Three Psalms, The Canticles of Advent and other works for choir and soloists.

Since his emergence as a composer, Palmer has received many commissions. His works include: a string quintet, Not Going Quietly, premiered by the Sydney Omega Ensemble in 2007; Concerto for Two Clarinets and Chamber Orchestra, performed by Dimitri Ashkenazy, David Rowden and the Sydney Omega Ensemble; Concertino for Two Guitars for Slava and Leonard Grigoryan and The Queensland Orchestra; a symphonic suite, The Beancounter, for the West Australian Youth Orchestra; a symphonic fantasia, Incandescence, for the Christchurch Symphony Orchestra conducted by Tom Woods; a song cycle for baritone and piano, Letters from a Black Snake, commissioned for the opening of the Sidney Nolan Retrospective at the Art Gallery of New South Wales and the National Gallery of Victoria; a piano quartet, The Way It Is, for the Seraphim Trio, a clarinet sonata, Black, White and a Little Blue, premiered in the Utzon Room at the Sydney Opera House by David Rowden in 2010. His works have been performed by orchestras and chamber groups in Australia, the United States and Europe and receive frequent airplay on classical music stations.

In July 2007, Palmer was commissioned to write the Papal Mass for World Youth Day 2008 in Sydney. The Mass, Benedictus Qui Venit, for large choir, soloists and orchestra, was performed in the presence of Pope Benedict XVI and an audience of 350,000 with soloists Amelia Farrugia, soprano, and Andrew Goodwin, tenor, directed by Benjamin Bayl.

In May 2016 his operatic adaptation of Tim Winton's novel Cloudstreet was premiered in Adelaide by the State Opera of South Australia. Hailed as "a resounding triumph" (The Australian) and "an extra-ordinary achievement" (Stagenoise), it played to critical acclaim and full houses.

From 2003 to 2011, Palmer was chairman of Pacific Opera, a not-for-profit company established to give Australia's best young singers professional development and the experience necessary to launch their careers. From 2007 to 2011, he was president of The Arts Law Centre of Australia, a government-funded body which provides free or low-cost legal and business advice to artists in all media throughout Australia. He is also a director of Ars Musica Australis which not only assists young performers in all media with grants or scholarships for further study in Australia and overseas but is also a prolific commissioner of new works from Australian composers.

Palmer's music is published by and available from the Australian Music Centre.

Style and musical ideology
In an essay "Learning to be a composer", Palmer wrote:

Palmer's style is essentially lyrical, ranging through the full spectrum of emotions. He endeavours to engage the audience, not alienate it, even when the subject matter is tragic or anguished. A work such as the string quintet Not Going Quietly, written in memory of Aaron McMillan, a brilliant Australian pianist who died of cancer at the age of 30, contains passages which are harsh and cry out in pain, as well as passages of gentle lyricism. His music can be deeply introspective, as in the timeless transparency of the second movement of the piano quartet The Way It Is, or boisterously, joyously energetic, as in the Ruritanian Dances for string orchestra.

On 29 August 2012, William Chen premiered Palmer's new Piano Concerto, accompanied by the Sydney Youth Orchestra. The piece was played at a cultural exchange concert, where pieces of Australian music were mixed with Chinese compositions. Palmer states that, "the concerto was based on Chinese musical ideas, but at the same time keeping an Australian identity".

Underlying all Palmer's music, however, whether vocal or instrumental, is his fascination with "the singing line".

Honours
In June 2010 he was appointed a Member of the Order of Australia (AM) for services to law and to music as a composer and in leadership roles. In 2020 he was created a Papal Knight in the Order of St Gregory the Great for services to music, particularly to liturgical music, and the law.

Key works

Opera
 Cloudstreet (2016; from the novel by Tim Winton)

Orchestral
 Concerto for Two Clarinets and Chamber Orchestra
Breaking the Silence, concerto for cello and chamber orchestra
 Concertino for Two Guitars and Orchestra
 Piano Concerto
 Incandescence
 The Beancounter Suite
 The Ruritanian Dances
 Toccata for Double String Orchestra
 Two Waltzes
In Paradisum

Vocal
 Mass A Child Is Born (SATB, soprano, tenor, orchestra)
 Mass Benedictus Qui Venit (SATB, soprano, tenor, orchestra)
 Three Psalms (SATB, soloists)
 Canticles of Advent (SATB)
 Letters from a Black Snake, song cycle (baritone, piano)
The Stubborn Heart, song cycle (soprano, piano)
Figures in an Urban Landscape, song cycle (baritone, piano)
The Faces of Mercy, (sop., SATB, clarinet, violin, viola, cello, organ)

Chamber
 String quintet Not Going Quietly
 Piano quartet The Way It Is
 Clarinet sonata Black, White and a Little Blue
Time Out, 3 pieces for oboe and piano
Ithaca, for clarinet, violin, viola and cello

References

External links
 
 Arts Law Centre of Australia

Judges of the Supreme Court of New South Wales
Australian male composers
Australian composers
Members of the Order of Australia
1947 births
Living people
Australian King's Counsel
Australian Roman Catholics
Composers of Christian music
People educated at Saint Ignatius' College, Riverview